YBL or Ybl may refer to:

 Campbell River Airport (IATA: YBL), British Columbia, Canada
 Miklós Ybl, Hungarian architect
 Yawkey Baseball League of Greater Boston
 Yellow Book of Lecan, a medieval Irish manuscript
 Yellow Bus Line, in Mindanao, Philippines
 Yukuben language (ISO 639:ybl), spoken in Nigeria
 166886 Ybl, a minor planet

See also
 YLB (disambiguation)